Choi Jin-Sil (December 24, 1968 – October 2, 2008) was a South Korean actress. She was considered one of the best actresses in South Korea, nicknamed "The Nation's Actress". She played leading roles in 18 films and 20 television dramas, appeared in 140 commercials and won the 33rd Grand Bell Award for Best Actress. She died by suicide by hanging on October 2, 2008, at her home in Seoul.

Early years
Choi was born as the first child to her parents Choi Guk-Hyeon and Jeong Ok-Suk on December 24, 1968, in Seoul. Her mother separated from her father in 1985 and divorced him in 1998. She had a younger brother, Choi Jin-young, who was an actor and singer.

Her family was so poor that her mother once managed the household by running a pojangmacha (a small street stall selling foods). She dreamed of becoming a star to escape from the poverty. She said in talk shows her nickname during her school days was "Choisujebi" because she used to eat sujebi (a dumpling soup) instead of ordinary meals due to the home environment. Although she later became a high-paid model and actress, she was known for frugality, even receiving awards for her savings activity and frugality.

Career
In 1987, Choi graduated from Seonil Girls' High School. She began in Korea's entertainment circles as an advertising film model. She began to gain celebrity status in an advertising campaign for Samsung Electronics in which she acted as a newly wedded housewife. In 1988, she became a TV actress starring in the MBC historical drama, 500 Years of Joseon. Her first film was North Korean Partisan in South Korea (1990). After several experiences in TV dramas as a supporting actress, Choi played leading roles in the movie My Love, My Bride (1990) and the MBC drama Jealousy (1992). In 1998, Choi published an autobiography Yes, Let's Live Truthfully Today Too, looking back at the change from an ordinary high school graduate to a famous actress. She largely stayed out of the limelight, raising her two children after her high-profile divorce in 2004. In 2005, she returned with the soap opera My Rosy Life in a role that resurrected her career. Her last work was Last Scandal (2008), generating many positive reviews from critics and viewers. A second season of Last Scandal was being planned for broadcast in November 2008 before her death. She was also an MC in a talk show, Choi Jin-sil 'Truth and Lie in 2008.

Personal life
In 1994, her former manager Bae Byeong-su, who was an influential figure in the entertainment field, was murdered by her road manager. She was called in as a witness. The incident shocked the Korean public. Rumors circulated that she was implicated in the crime and she was defamed by unspecified individuals. She had a traffic accident in 1995 and was often the victim of stalking, having nearly been abducted in 1994 and 1998.

Marriage and divorce 
In 2000, her marriage to Cho Sung-min received widespread attention in South Korea. Cho was a professional baseball player with the Yomiuri Giants of Japan. They first met on a television show in 1998. Choi gave birth to a son  (2001) and a daughter Joon-Hee (2003).

Cho insisted that Choi was a blameful spouse through the press without filing a lawsuit for divorce in December 2004. It was senseless act according to South Korean civil law. Choi privately had the consideration period in connection with divorce for about two years from 2002 to 2004. Choi had not been sued for divorce for the period. In September 2004, Choi decided to divorce Cho.

Cho committed a breach of marital fidelity, violence and defamation against Choi for about two years from 2002 to 2004. In addition, Cho borrowed money from Choi's mother and Choi's younger brother and defaulted on the debt; Cho was sued for it by them. In November 2002, Cho physically attacked Choi, who was pregnant at the time with their second child. In August 2004, Cho again assaulted her. The former violence was known to people in December 2002 by Cho and Cho insisted that the violence had been mutual attack to the press. Cho insisted that the latter violence also had been mutual attack. The case was widely publicized in the media.

Choi won the parental rights and child custody over the children on condition of exempting Cho's debt to her mother and brother as well as dropping several charges against Cho. Cho could visit his children regularly according to the mutual agreement. Choi won sole custody.

In January 2008, the South Korean family register (hoju) was changed. As a result, children could now use their maternal family name. According to the register, her children changed their surname from "Cho" (paternal family name) to "Choi" (maternal family name).

After Choi's death, her mother managed the inheritance and was awarded custody of the children. The older of the two children is singer Choi Hwan-hee, who goes by the stage name Z.flat and made his debut in November 2020.

Allegations of domestic violence
In August 2004, Choi Jin-sil came forward as a victim of domestic violence. Subsequently, the advertiser, Shinhan Engineering and Construction, claimed she had not kept her contractual obligation to "maintain dignity" as she had disclosed to the public her bruised and swollen face which was caused by the violence of her then husband.

On June 4, 2009, the Supreme Court reversed a high court ruling that decided in favour of Choi in a compensation suit filed by the advertiser in 2004 against the actress, who was the model for its apartments. In handing down its ruling, the Supreme Court censured Choi for coming forward and declaring herself a victim of domestic violence, saying it constituted a failure to maintain proper "social and moral honour". Her two children became defendants as heirs.

On June 9, 2009, Korean Womenlink, the Korea Women's Hot Line, and the Korea Women's Association United issued a joint statement lambasting the ruling. Women's groups censured the Supreme Court for not realising the suffering of domestic violence victims, which included Choi. As to the ruling, the groups claimed that revealing the results of domestic violence was not a matter of "dignity" but a matter of "survival". "When a person is suffering, he or she needs to restore their dignity and social honour by disclosing the damage and seeking proper legal help as Choi did", a director of Korean Womenlink said.

Suicide
Choi was found hanged at home at Seoul; the cause of death was deemed to be suicide. Police said that Choi had killed herself at around midnight. Her suicide was confirmed by the police. She was survived by her two children, her mother and younger brother Choi Jin-Young, who died by suicide a year and a half later. Choi's suicide was linked in the media to a temporary 70% increase in suicide in South Korea for about a month after her death; police recorded 700 more suicides in that month than would have been typical statistically.

Cause
On September 8, 2008, Ahn Jae-hwan, the husband of popular comedian Jeong Sun-Hee, was found dead in his car. Ahn died by suicide apparently due to distress over mounting debts. Jeong and Choi had been close friends for a long time; at his funeral Choi appeared deeply shaken. Shortly after, rumours circulated on the web that Choi, as a loan shark, had lent a large sum of money to Ahn. On September 22, 2008, Choi sought a police probe into the source of the rumours, calling them groundless. On September 28, 2008, police arrested a securities company employee for spreading the rumours.

Choi suffered greater stress amid rumours circulating on the Internet that she was involved in the suicide of fellow actor Ahn Jae-Hwan.

In response to Choi's death, the South Korean government tried to strengthen a legal push to regulate Internet postings. Politicians have reacted by proposing legislation that would impose a more rigorous real name registration requirement on the Internet and more heightened punishment for libelous statements.

Press reaction
The news of her death was widely reported and large number of reporters rushed to Choi's house to cover the event. Major portal websites blocked online users from leaving comments on articles concerning Choi, fearing that some users might leave malicious comments.

"Almost 80 percent of South Korea's households have broadband access, fostering active online interactions. Most Web sites here have bulletin boards where users can post uncensored, anonymous comments, and nearly all young people run their own blogs, updating via cellphone. Such sites were a major avenue for rumors about the possible dangers of dropping a ban on American beef that fed enormous street protests and political upheaval earlier this year. Major Web portals have in recent years doubled the number of monitors to screen out online character assassination and respond more quickly to complaints of malicious rumors. But many victims still complained that vicious rumors spread so fast their reputations were ruined virtually overnight", The New York Times commented on her death on October 2, 2008.

"She was more than South Korea's Julia Roberts or Angelina Jolie. For nearly 20 years, Choi was the country's cinematic sweetheart and as close to being a 'national' actress as possible. But since her body was found on Oct. 2, an apparent suicide, she has become a symbol of the difficulties women face in this deeply conservative yet technologically savvy society. Incessant online gossip appears to have been largely to blame for her death. But it's also clear that public life as a single, working, divorced mom—still a pariah status in South Korea—was one role she had a lot of trouble with", Time commented on her death on October 6, 2008.

Theft of urn
On August 15, 2009, Choi's ashes were stolen from her burial site. The police hunt for a suspect was aided by surveillance camera images showing a man carrying out the theft. On August 25, 2009, the police arrested him and Choi's ashes were found in his home.

A small memorial park for Choi Jin-Sil has been built in a cemetery in Gyeonggi Province. Choi's ashes were placed in the new tomb in the park in the Gapsan Park Cemetery in Yangpyeong on September 28, 2009. Security devices have been installed to prevent a recurrence of the theft, with the tomb specially manufactured in China and more surveillance cameras placed around the tomb.

Choi Jin-sil Foundation
Choi was the "big sister" who led the so-called "Choi Jin-Sil Association". It was a friendly group of close celebrities that included the comedians Lee Young-Ja and Jeong Sun-Hee, the models Hong Jin-Kyung and Lee So-Ra, and the actresses Choi Hwa-Jung and Uhm Jung-Hwa. After Choi's death, they founded "The Choi Jin-Sil Foundation" for charity.

Drama synopsis
The drama synopsis  As Life Goes On (사노라면) which Choi Jin-Sil had written was found in her home after her death.

Filmography

Film

TV drama

Awards

Film awards 
 Grand Bell Awards
 1995 (33rd) - Best Actress for How to Top My Wife
 1993 (31st) - Most Popular Actress
 1991 (29th) - Best New Actress for My Love, My Bride
 Blue Dragon Film Awards
 1991 (12th), 1992 (13th), 1993 (14th), 1994 (15th), 1995 (16th), 1997 (18th), 1998 (19th) - Popular Star Award
 1990 (11th) - Best New Actress for Nambugun
 Baeksang Arts Awards
 2006, Best Actress for Television
 1991, 1995, 1997 - Most Popular Actress
 Chunsa Film Art Awards
 1991, Best New Actress

Broadcasting awards
 KBS Drama Awards
 2005, Top Excellence Award, Actress; Netizen Award; Best Couple Award
 1998, Top Excellence Award, Actress
 MBC Drama Awards
 1997, Top Excellence Award, Actress
 2008, Achievement Award
 SBS Drama Awards
 1994, Top Excellence Award, Actress 
 1995, Top Excellence Award, Actress
 Grimae Awards
 1998, Best Actress 
 Korea Broadcasting Association Awards
 1998, Best Actress

Broadcasting nominations
 2008 MBC Drama Awards
 Top Excellence Award, Actress
 Best Couple Award
 2007 MBC Drama Awards
 Top Excellence Award, Actress

See also
Suicide in South Korea

References

External links
 
 
 Choi Jin-sil at HanCinema

1968 births
2008 deaths
Actresses from Seoul
South Korean female models
South Korean film actresses
South Korean television actresses
Suicides by hanging in South Korea
Female suicides
Jin-sil
Models from Seoul
Victims of cyberbullying
2008 suicides
Best Actress Paeksang Arts Award (film) winners
Best Actress Paeksang Arts Award (television) winners